The name Omar has been used for three tropical cyclones worldwide:

In the Atlantic Ocean:
 Hurricane Omar (2008) – A Category 4 hurricane that grazed the Netherlands Antilles, Puerto Rico, and the Virgin Islands, doing minor to moderate damage and causing 1 indirect death.
 Tropical Storm Omar (2020) – Minimal tropical storm that caused rip currents and swells in the Carolinas, earliest fifteenth named storm on record in the Atlantic.

In the Western Pacific Ocean: 
 Typhoon Omar (1992) (T9215, 15W, Lusing) – Strong Category 4 super typhoon in the Pacific Ocean, struck Guam, Taiwan, and China, causing 2 deaths and about half a billion dollars in damage. The name was retired after the 1992 season, and was replaced with Oscar for the 1995 season.

Atlantic hurricane set index articles
Pacific typhoon set index articles